Hristo Simeonov (Bulgarian: Христо Симеонов) (born May 14, 1935) is a Bulgarian artist known for the creation of a new direction in art he called pario-realism. Pario-realism being the expression of unachievable states and modes of consciousness and physical reality through the visualization of common elements, meaning the use of known elements of thought and perception to which all are familiar, however used to construct the image of an impossible, otherwise unthinkable reality.

Biography 

In the spring of 1950, in a small shop at 25 Fritjof Nansen Street, Sofia, Hristo's father covered the walls with numerous watercolors, which was made by Hristo in the environs of the city. This was Hristo's first 'artwork'. Several years later, the future artist was forced out of necessity to sell all his paintings for as little as much as a loaf of bread. 

Hristo Simeonov graduated in painting from the Sofia Art Academy in 1960. His first exhibition of pario-realistic works was commented upon by Kiril Krustev, an art critic, in the Izkustvo journal, as follows: “In November 1978, Hristo Simeonov opened the most unexpected and astonishing exhibition ever held by a Bulgarian artist.” This judgement received an ultimate confirmation in 1988, when Simeonov staged his second pario-realistic show and published his essay “The Painting. Pario-realism”.

In 1994 he was invited to mount the first exhibition ever shown by a Bulgarian artist on the premises of the United Nations in New York City. From 1995 to 2006, he published in succession three essays on Rhythm in Nature: “The Gravitational Universe”, “The Ecatalic Universe” and “The Error of Edwin Hubble”; all three were later brought out together under the title: “Three Imaginary Letters to Stephen Hawking – My Ant-Ego”. Hristo Simeonov lives and works on the borderline between art and science, giving expression of his thoughts and meditations through his paintings. This is shown by their titles: Beyond the Event Horizon, The Poetical Boundary between Matter and Anti-Matter, Transmutation, Divergence, Mutant, The Mirages of Eos, The Light of the Pulsars, The City beyond the Magellan’s Clouds, etc.

References

Further reading
"Картини-алактики, или що е париореализъм", Radio Bulgaria, July 20, 2011

1935 births
Living people
Artists from Sofia